Silvia Schinzel (born 2 June 1958) is an Austrian sprinter. She competed in the women's 200 metres at the 1976 Summer Olympics.

References

1958 births
Living people
Athletes (track and field) at the 1976 Summer Olympics
Austrian female sprinters
Olympic athletes of Austria
Place of birth missing (living people)
Olympic female sprinters